Fedotovskaya is a rural locality (a village) in Kotlassky District, Arkhangelsk Oblast, Russia. The population was 613 as of 2010. There are 9 streets.

Geography 
Fedotovskaya is located on the Severnaya Dvina River, 39 km northwest of Kotlas (the district's administrative centre) by road. Kharitonovo is the nearest rural locality.

References 

Rural localities in Kotlassky District